Bertilla or Bertila may refer to:

Berthild of Chelles (died 692), also called Bertilla, Frankish abbess
Bertila of Spoleto (died 915), also spelled Bertilla, queen consort of Italy
Bertil Almqvist (1902–1972), nicknamed Bertila, Swedish writer and illustrator